Bowater was a British and later American paper milling company.

Bowater may also refer to:

Bowater (surname)
Bowater baronets